Tantalus Bluffs are high rock bluffs forming the northeast shoulder of Mount Ferguson, overlooking the west side of the terminus of Liv Glacier near its entry into Ross Ice Shelf. It was named by the Southern Party of New Zealand Geological Survey Antarctic Expedition (NZGSAE) (1963–64) because the bluffs appeared to be of geologic interest but could not be reached. In attempting to penetrate the crevasse field northeast of the bluffs, one of the geologists was injured in a crevasse accident.

References 

Cliffs of Antarctica
Dufek Coast